Gretchen Ong Ho (born April 19, 1990) is a Filipino television presenter and former volleyball player. She played collegiate volleyball for the Ateneo Lady Eagles from 2008 to 2013, where she was a member of the "fab five" who brought Ateneo to their first back-to-back UAAP finals appearances (seasons 74 and 75). She then played professionally for the Petron Blaze Spikers in the Philippine Super Liga (PSL) from 2013 to 2015, where she helped the team win the 2014 Grand Prix Conference.

Having earned a double degree in BS Management Engineering and AB Communications, and a minor in Development Management from Ateneo de Manila University, Ho moved to television work. She debuted as one of the hosts of Gameday Weekend, a sports magazine show on Balls and ABS-CBN Sports+Action. She previously worked as an anchor, segment host, and field reporter for various ABS-CBN programs, such as Umagang Kay Ganda, TV Patrol, News Patrol, The Score, and University Town.

On April 19, 2020, Ho launched her own brand and online platform, Woman In Action, with an article titled, COVID19: My Birthday Eve. According to her, she created the website to create a "safe space" where she and anyone else can share their stories. "In this time of the COVID-19 crisis, we'd like to share more #happinews to the world. Let’s all help uplift each other’s spirits," Ho wrote on the website.

Under "Woman In Action", Ho started her "Donate A Bike, Save A Job" campaign, providing more than 1000 bicycles to the most vulnerable during the COVID-19 pandemic. The bikes were distributed to 10 cities all over Metro Manila, even reaching typhoon victims in Naga and Cagayan.

On January 26, 2021, Ho officially transferred to TV5 after 7 years on ABS-CBN as part of its retrenchment program caused by the ABS-CBN shutdown from the Philippine Congress that junked the new ABS-CBN legislative franchise to operate.

Career

Volleyball
She played varsity volleyball in high school for Immaculate Conception Academy-Greenhills. While in college, she played for Ateneo De Manila University for 5 years. She also played professional volleyball for two years, suiting up for the Petron Trail Blazers in the Philippine Super Liga from 2013 to 2015, as well as the PSL Beach Volleyball Cup in 2015. She is one of the co-founders of Beach Volleyball Republic.

Clubs
  Petron Blaze Spikers (2013–2015)

Television
 Gameday Weekend (2014–2016) – ABS-CBN Sports and Action and Balls and ABS-CBN Sports and Action HD
 Team U (2014) – ABS-CBN Sports and Action
 The Score (2014) – ABS-CBN Sports and Action
 CHInoyTV (2014) – People's Television Network
 TV Patrol (2015); Guest Star Patroller – ABS-CBN
 Mornings @ ANC (2015–2016); Host – ANC
 The Daily Serve (2015–2020);  Anchor – ANC
 Modern Girls (2016–2017); Host –  Lifestyle
 CHInoyTV (2017–2018); Host – ABS-CBN News Channel
 University Town (2016–2020); (S+A)
 Umagang Kay Ganda (2016–2020); Host – ABS-CBN
 TV Patrol (2015–2018); Segment Host – ABS-CBN
 Frontline Pilipinas (2021–present); Sports Segment Anchor – TV5
 The Big Story (2021–present); Anchor – One News
 Frontline sa Umaga (2022–present); Anchor – TV5

TV specials
 Wish Music Awards (2016–present); Host
 Binibining Pilipinas 2017 (2017); Judge – ABS-CBN
 PMPC Star Awards For TV (2015); Host & Presenter – ABS-CBN
 Mr. & Ms. Chinatown (2015–2020); Host – ABS-CBN

Advocacy and issues 
On May 22, 2017, Ho became an Ambassador for Health and Nutrition of the Philippine branch of the humanitarian aid, development, and advocacy organization World Vision.

Ho has also spoken out publicly on various social issues. In 2018 she spoke out about the importance of freedom, saying "That’s the media’s responsibility in a democracy: to keep power in check."  In 2020 she added her voice to the many others who asked for the government to unveil concrete plans to fight the COVID-19 pandemic in the Philippines.

Recognition 
 2022 Paragala Media Awards -- Paragala Pang Kabataan: News and Current Affairs 
 2020 Paragala Media Awards -- Best News Personality 
 2020 3rd Gawad Lasallianeta -- Most Outstanding Female Correspondent 
 2019 Gawad Pilipino -- Best New Female Segment Host for the Year 
 2018 PMPC Star Awards for TV – Best Lifestyle Show and Best Morning Show Hosts UKG Barkada Winner (Umagang Kay Ganda)
 2016 PMPC Star Awards for TV – Best Lifestyle Show and Best Morning Show Hosts UKG Barkada Winner (Umagang Kay Ganda)
 Halalan 2016 "Bayan Mo, iPatrol Mo" Ambassador
 2016 USTv XII Awards—Student's Choice of Personality for Social Media Development, Ranked No. 61
 2015 PMPC Star Awards for TV – Best Lifestyle Show and Best Lifestyle Show Host Nominee (ChinoyTV)
 Hall of Famer – First Philippine Superliga Ambassadress
 Female Hothlete of the Year – Yahoo Celebrity Awards 2014
 FHM Philippines 100 Sexiest Women 2014, Ranked No. 100
 FHM Philippines 100 Sexiest Women 2015, Ranked No. 61

References 

1990 births
Filipino women's volleyball players
Living people
Ateneo de Manila University alumni
Filipino people of Chinese descent
University Athletic Association of the Philippines volleyball players
Star Magic
Filipina gravure idols
ABS-CBN News and Current Affairs people
Filipino television sportscasters
Middle blockers
Wing spikers